Recht is a German and Dutch word meaning "right" in both the sense of the body relative direction or the legal sense of rights. It may refer to:

Topography
Recht, a sub-municipality of the city of St. Vith in Belgium
Recht (crater), a small impact crater on the far side of the Moon

People with the surname
Albert William Recht (1898–1962), American mathematician and astronomer
Camille Recht, German writer, critic and editor
Rick Recht (born 1970), American rock musician
Sruli Recht (born 1977), designer and artist based in Reykjavík, Iceland
Bernd Rechts, fictional comic book character

See also
 Translating "law" to other European languages
 

Surnames of French origin
Surnames of German origin